The Langat River is a river in Selangor, Malaysia. The Langat River is 78 km long, with a catchment of 2350 km², and originates from the Titiwangsa Range at Gunung Nuang. It drains westward to the Straits of Malacca. The major tributaries of the Langat River are the Sungai Semenyih and Sungai Labu.

Towns along the Langat River basin
[
  {
    "type": "ExternalData",
    "service": "geoline",
    "ids": "Q2366430",
    "properties": {
      "stroke": "#669999",
      "stroke-width": 6
    }
  },
]
 Dusun Tua
 Batu 14 Hulu Langat
 Cheras
 Bandar Tun Hussein Onn
 Kajang
 Bandar Baru Bangi
 Dengkil
 Cyberjaya
 Putrajaya
 Banting
 Teluk Datok
 Jenjarom
 Jugra
 Carey Island

See also
 List of rivers of Malaysia

References

Rivers of Selangor
Nature sites of Selangor
Rivers of Malaysia